Helen LaKelly Hunt (born February 1949) is an American activist and writer. The daughter of H. L. Hunt, she grew up in Dallas, Texas. She holds earned and honorary degrees from Union Theological Seminary (NY) and Southern Methodist University.

Life and career
She is founder and president of The Sister Fund.

Hunt lives in Dallas, Texas, with her husband, Harville Hendrix.

Helen LaKelly Hunt along with her husband developed Imago Relationship Therapy. Together they have three children, Hunter Hunt-Hendrix, the vocalist of the American black metal band Liturgy, Leah Hunt-Hendrix, an Occupy movement activist, and Kimberly June Miller, co-author of the book Boundaries for Your Soul.

She is a member of the Hunt oil/football family. Her brother Lamar founded the American Football League and the Kansas City Chiefs. Her nephew Clark, Lamar's son, became co-owner and chairman of the board for the Chiefs after Lamar's death.

Bibliography 
Hunt has written several books on feminism, including Faith and Feminism: A Holy Alliance and And The Spirit Moved Them: The Lost Radical History of America's First Feminists.

 
 

She was also a contributor to the book Becoming Myself: Reflections on Growing Up Female.

 

Hunt has co-authored multiple books with her husband, including:

 Hendrix, Harville; LaKelly Hunt, Helen (1988). Getting the Love You Want: A Guide for Couples. St. Martin's Griffin. .
 Hendrix, Harville; LaKelly Hunt, Helen (1993). Keeping the Love You Find. Atria. .
 Hendrix, Harville; LaKelly Hunt, Helen (1997). Giving the Love That Heals. Atria. .
 Hendrix, Harville; LaKelly Hunt, Helen (2004). Receiving Love. Atria. .
 Hendrix, Harville; LaKelly Hunt, Helen (2013). Making Marriage Simple: Ten Relationship-Saving Truths. Harmony Books. .
 Hendrix, Harville; LaKelly Hunt, Helen (2017). The Space Between: The Point of Connection. Franklin, TN: Clovercroft Publishing. .

References

External links 
 Helen's official website
 Biography – at The Sister Fund's website
 short biography  – at Imago A new Way to Love website

1949 births
Hunt family
Living people
Relationship education
Hockaday School alumni
Southern Methodist University alumni
Activists from Texas
Philanthropists from Texas
People from Texas
American feminists
20th-century American women writers
21st-century American women writers
American self-help writers
American relationships and sexuality writers